Oskar Uhlig was a German figure skater. He won the first European Figure Skating Championships to be contested.

He represented Berliner Eislaufverein von 1886. On 12 October 1893 he was elected as the Chairman of the club Berliner Eislaufverein von 1886. From 1900 on he was Vice-chairman of the club.

In 1894 Uhlig was also referee of speed skating events.

Figure skating Result

References
Skatabase: 1880s Europeans
Book: "Kunst des Eislaufs" by George Helfrich, year 1921, page 60
Deutscher Eissport No. 2, 1 November 1893
Deutscher Eissport 8 November 1900

Navigation

German male single skaters
Year of birth missing
Year of death missing
European Figure Skating Championships medalists